David Thorne may refer to:

 David Thorne (British Army officer) (1933–2000)
 David Thorne (diplomat) (born 1944), American businessman and diplomat
 David Thorne (cricketer) (born 1964), English cricketer
 David Thorne (rugby league), (born 1965), Australian rugby league footballer
 David Thorne (writer) (born 1972), Australian humourist, satirist and author